Sligo County Council is the authority responsible for local government in County Sligo, Ireland. As a county council, it is governed by the Local Government Act 2001. The council is responsible for housing and community, roads and transportation, urban planning and development, amenity and culture, and environment. The council has 18 elected members. Elections are held every five years and are by single transferable vote. The head of the council has the title of Cathaoirleach (Chairperson). The county administration is headed by a Chief Executive, Martin Lydon. The county town is Sligo.

History
Originally meetings of Sligo County Council were held at Sligo Courthouse. The county council moved to modern facilities, known as County Hall, in June 1979.

Following the 2015 RTÉ programme Standards in Public Office, in March 2019, Joe Queenan was found by the Standards in Public Office Commission to have contravened the Local Government Act in three different instances, including failure to maintain proper standards of integrity, conduct and concern for the public interest.

Local Electoral Areas and Municipal Districts
Sligo County Council is divided into the following borough and municipal districts and local electoral areas, defined by electoral divisions. The municipal district which contains the administrative area of the former Sligo Borough Council is referred to as a Borough District.

Councillors

2019 seats summary

Councillors by electoral area
This list reflects the order in which councillors were elected on 24 May 2019.

Notes

Co-options

References

External links

Politics of County Sligo
County councils in the Republic of Ireland